Shashenk may be a misspelling of:

 Shashank
 Shawshank

See also
Shoshenq